Macarostola haemataula is a moth of the family Gracillariidae. It is known from Karnataka, India.

Description: Thorax crimson. Forewings crimson, markings yellow-whitish, partially black-edged. Three triangular dorsal spots reaching half across wing.

References 

Macarostola
Moths of Asia
Moths described in 1912